Maria Flordeluna is a Philippine primetime soap opera that aired on ABS-CBN and DZMM TeleRadyo in the Philippines and on The Filipino Channel worldwide. A radio version of the series aired weekdays on DZMM Radyo Patrol 630 in the Philippines. The show aired from February 12, 2007, to June 22, 2007, replacing Super Inggo and was replaced by Ysabella.

The series is based on the Flordeluna radio drama of the 1970s written by Marcos Navarro Sacol. Flordeluna was first adapted for television by RPN in the 1970s starring Janice de Belen in the title role. It tells the story of the title character, an 11-year-old girl, and her efforts in bringing her family together against all odds.

Cast and characters

Cast
Main cast
 Eliza Pineda as Ma. Flordelunaa "Flor" A. Alicante†
 Eula Valdez as Josephine "Jo" Espero-Alicante
 Albert Martinez as Gen. Leo Alicante / Leo A. Alvarado
 John Estrada as Gary "Spider" Alvarado
 Vina Morales as Ma. Elvira Aragoncillo-Alicante†
 Liza Lorena as Brigida "Mamita" Espero
 Alwyn Uytingco as Jacob Charles "JC" Custodio
 Jill Yulo as Annie Natividad
 Johnny Delgado† as Ret. Gen. Carlos Alvarado†
 Roldan Aquino† as Tibor Natividad
 Nash Aguas as Renato Manuel "Rene Boy" A. Alicante
 Kristel Fulgar as Wilma Espero
 Minnie Aguilar as Soling

Supporting cast
 Mark Dionisio as Lt. Col. Isagani Fernandez
 Frances Ignacio as Marie Cuanio
 Menggie Cobarrubias† as General Torres
 Neil Ryan Sese as Adolfo Perez
 Cheena Crab as Greta
 Darius Cardano as Mark
 Johann Nicdao as Marco
 Peewee OHara as Iya: She is JC's yaya or nanny who helps him and Annie realize their feelings for each other.
 Dennis Coronel as Captain Castro
 Nikki Bagaporo as Angel: She is Flor's best friend at school.
 Ariel Reonal as Ariel Trono: He's a television news correspondent who reports on the controversy about Leo Alicante and Gary/Spider and later on contacts the latter for a price.
Guest cast
 Carlo Artillaga as Lawyer of Leo
 Bing Davao as Young Carlos
 Mika Dela Cruz as Ma. Flordeluna "Flor" E. Alicante II
 Patrick dela Rosa as Allan
 Gabb Drillon as Teenage Gary
 Franzen Fajardo as Enteng
 Mar Garchitorena as Governor Aragoncillo
 Tanya Gomez as Teresita V. Alicante
 Nanding Josef as Mang Jose
 Mike Lloren as Max
 Ricky Rivero as Police Investigator
 Yul Servo as Danillo Ferrer
 Yvette Taguera as Lias

Radio cast
There was the voice cast of the radio version of Maria Flordeluna which was broadcast weekdays at 2:30PM on DZMM. It ended to make way for MMK sa DZMM.
 Roxanne Manato as Ma. Flordeluna Alicante
 Christian Alvear as Renato Manuel "Rene Boy" Alicante
 Mary Joy Adorable as Wilma Espero
 Rosanna Villegas as Jo Espero
 Danny Depante as Leo Alicante
 Abby Masilongan as Elvira Aragoncillo-Alicante
 Eric Galvez as Gary Alvarado

Theme songs
The series theme song is "Maria Flordeluna" and was written by Arden Condez and Jonathan Manalo. It was composed and arranged by Jonathan Manalo and is performed by Sheryn Regis. The song was nominated for a 2007 Awit Award.

There are also two love themes: "Hanggang May Kailanman" performed by Vina Morales, but originally performed by Carol Banawa (both versions were used on the show) and "Lihim" performed by Acel Bisa.
Also used during the show is a version of "Lihim" sung by Alwyn Uytingco and Jill Yulo.

Reception
Maria Flordeluna was the only primetime drama series in 2007 on either ABS-CBN or GMA to have gained viewers through the duration of its run until its eventual record breaking finale episode. It currently holds the record as the highest rated program on nationwide Philippine television (42.3%, based on monthly nationwide ratings) since AGB Nielsen's nationwide urban television audience measurement service (NUTAM) was first launched in October 2006. The finale episode itself holds the record as the highest NUTAM rated series finale (and highest rated episode of a regular series) with a 49.3%.

Awards and nominations

The 21st Star Awards for Television
The series was nominated for Best Primetime Drama Series at the 21st Star Awards for Television, given by The Philippine Movie Press Club.

The 20th Awit Awards 2007
The theme song, "Maria Flordeluna," was nominated in the category of Best Song Written for Movie/TV/Stage Play.

Catholic Mass Media Awards 2008
The series is nominated for Best Drama Series/Program against fellow ABS-CBN series Lobo and Maalaala Mo Kaya.

Credits
 Directed by Jerry Lopez Sineneng
 2nd Unit Director: Rechie del Carmen
 Headwriter Arah Jell Badayos
 Writers: Rose Colindres, Arden Condez
 Executive Producers: Minnella Abad, Myleen Ongkiko
 Musical Director: Jessie Lasaten
 Lighting Director: Christopher Manjares, George Tutanes
 Production Designers: Sammy Aranzamendez, Malou Dugtong-de Guzman
 Creative Consultant: Loida Viriña
 Creative Manager: Jake Tordesillas
 Production Manager: Annaliza A. Goma
 Executive-in-Charge of Creative: Olivia M. Lamasan
 Executive-in-Charge of Production: Malou N. Santos
 Associate Producer Maria Eleanor Trono
 Assistant Directors Bombee Blaza, Raymond Ocampo, Paul Michael Acero

Production
More than 1,000 young actresses auditioned for the role of Maria Flordeluna which eventually went to Eliza Pineda. The pilot episode aired for approximately one hour and 20 minutes on Monday, February 12, 2007. The finale episode had a runtime of approximately 45 minutes (excluding commercials).
The original role was played by TV host and actress child star Janice de Belen.
The writer of the story is Loida Virina, who also made Gulong ng Palad. Both her serials were very successful and remade on ABS-CBN.
The 1970s version ran for 10 years, while the 2007 version ran for 4 months.
Eliza Pineda and Kristel Fulgar were together for the second time after the drama series Bituin, as the young Desiree Del Valle (Eliza) and young Carol Banawa (Kristel).

See also
List of programs broadcast by ABS-CBN
List of ABS-CBN drama series

References

External links
 Maria Flordeluna Official Website
 Maria Flordeluna Official Blog
 
 ABS-CBN Forums - Maria Flordeluna Forum
 Maria Flordeluna Thread at Pinoy Exchange Forums
 Maria Flordeluna at Telebisyon.net

2007 Philippine television series debuts
2007 Philippine television series endings
ABS-CBN drama series
Television series by Star Creatives
Filipino-language television shows
Television shows set in the Philippines